is an album by the Italian composer Carlo Forlivesi. It was released in 2008 by ALM Records.

"Silenziosa luna" is a quotation from Giacomo Leopardi's poem Canto notturno di un pastore errante dell'Asia.

Description
The album includes works written by Forlivesi between 1999 and 2008. The 28-page booklet reflects the artistic and cultural concerns of the team about the recording, and the liner notes provide information about the musicians and lyrics and give details on the extent of each musical work, placing them in cultural and creative contexts. They were written in Italian originally and directly translated into Japanese and English, respectively by Japanese musicologist Mariko Kanemitsu and British composer/poet Jeremy Drake. Japanese jiuta-mai dancer Sayuri Uno, American academic Laura Hein (Northwestern University) and Italian philosopher Marco Forlivesi (University of Padua) also made a significant contribution to this process.

The instrumental techniques developed on purpose for these works are highly demanding. 24bit/96kHz recording technology is employed. 

The photograph on the album cover is a shot taken by Carlo Forlivesi and Sayuri Uno in Shisendō and represents a round Tsukubai enhanced by natural shadows and reflections. It is a non-processed image, and has sprinkled silver and gold colors, resembling maki-e making. The disc fits the photo.

Performers
Yukio Tanaka voice and biwa
Kumiko Shuto voice and biwa
Yosuke Irie shakuhachi
Ayako Shigenari 13-string koto and 20-string koto
Norio Sato guitar

Track listing 
1. Boethius [8:27] biwa
2. Japanese Window – Sesshu's Landscape 1495 [9:37] electronic music
3. Audivi Vocem [2:10] shakuhachi, 20-string koto and guitar
4–7. Nuove Musiche per Biwa [14:35] two biwas
8. Through the Looking-Glass [3:36] electronic music
9. Ugetsu  [5:10] shakuhachi and guitar
10–12. En la Soledat i el Silenci [7:31] 13-string koto and guitar
13–15. Requiem [14:59] electronic music

Credits 
Director: Yukio Kojima, Carlo Forlivesi
Recording engineer & tape editor: Yukio Kojima
Assistant engineer: Miho Fujimoto
Notes: Carlo Forlivesi
Translation: Jeremy Drake (English), Mariko Kanemitsu (Japanese), Sayuri Uno (Japanese)
Design: Natsue Yamanaka
Booklet editing: Tomomi Kato

External links 
  ALM Records 
  Kotenha 
  Amazon 
  HMV 

Compositions by Carlo Forlivesi
2008 classical albums
Giacomo Leopardi